= Merrick Systems =

Software company

Merrick Systems, Inc.
- Type: Incorporated
- Industry: Energy Software
- Founded: 1989
- Headquarters: Houston, Texas, United States
- Key people: Samina Farid Chairman & Kemal Farid CEO
- Number of employees: 50+
- Website: Merrick Systems

Merrick Systems, Inc. (Merrick) provides industrial information technologies for the midstream and upstream oil and gas industry. Merrick delivers integrated applications including real-time surveillance and optimization, field operations management, field data capture, hydrocarbon production accounting, mobile computing for field and drilling operations, and ruggedized RFID for drilling and asset management.

Merrick employs nearly 80 people and is headquartered in Houston, Texas.

Merrick’s worldwide presence today includes the Middle East, Asia Pacific, Northern Europe and the Americas.

== History ==
Merrick was co-founded by Samina Farid and Kemal Farid, an aunt-nephew team in 1989.

Merrick launched its first product to the market in 1992. Today, Merrick’s software is used in 20% of all oil and gas wells in the United States of America and around the globe.

In 2011, Merrick received a majority investment from HitecVision, a leading oil and gas focused private equity firm. The founders of Merrick, Samina Farid, Chairman, and Kemal Farid, CEO, remain significant shareholders in the company. In 2014, Merrick was acquired by P2 Energy Solutions of Denver, Colorado.
